Lomakin is a Russian masculine surname, its feminine counterpart is Lomakina. It may refer to

Aleksandr Lomakin (born 1995), Russian football player
Andrei Lomakin (1964–2006), Russian ice hockey player
Elena Lomakin, Russian-American artist
Nikolai Pavlovich Lomakin, General during the conquest of Khiva, defeated at the Battle of Geok Tepe (1879)
Oleg Lomakin (1924–2010), Russian realist painter
Trofim Lomakin (1924–1973), Russian weightlifter
Vasily Lomakin (1899–1943), Soviet Army colonel and Hero of the Soviet Union

Russian-language surnames